Dalbe Station is a railway station on the Riga – Jelgava Railway.

References 

Railway stations in Latvia
Railway stations opened in 1920